The Story So Far is a documentary film featuring the rock band, New Found Glory.

Content

The Story So Far
Opening
The Beginning 97-99
Tour Life
Europe
Australia
Recording
Behind the Scenes
The Story So Far

Videos
Dressed To Kill
Hit Or Miss
My Friends Over You
Head On Collision
Hit Or Miss (Original Drive-Thru Video)

Bonus Content
Bonus NFG Feature, filmed and produced by Fade Front Left Video Magazine (Running time 44:46) 
Drive-Thru Commercial

2002 films
New Found Glory albums